The 2018 Walsh Cup was an inter-county hurling competition based mainly in the Irish province of Leinster. It took place in December 2017 and January 2018.

For the first time, no third-level college teams took part. 10 Leinster counties, plus Antrim, competed. Longford and Louth entered the second-ranked Kehoe Cup.

Wexford were the 2018 champions, beating Kilkenny 3–2 in a free-taking competition after the final ended level on 1-24 each after extra time.	
This was the first inter-county hurling game to be decided by the taking of frees.

Format

There are 11 teams, in three groups of 3 teams and one group of 2 teams. In the three-team groups, each team plays the other teams once. In the two-team group, the teams play each other twice. Two points are awarded for a win and one for a draw.

The four group winners advance to the semi-finals.

Group stage

Group 1

Group 2

Group 3

Group 4

Knock-out stage

Semi-finals

Final

References

Walsh Cup
Walsh Cup (hurling)